Balyklybashevo (Balıqlıbaş) is a rural locality (a selo) in Karalachiksky Selsoviet, Fyodorovsky District, Bashkortostan, Russia. The population was 161 as of 2010. There are 5 streets.

Geography 
Balyklybashevo is located 9 km south of Fyodorovka (the district's administrative centre) by road. Karalachik is the nearest rural locality.

References 

Rural localities in Fyodorovsky District